The following are lists of institutions of higher education by endowment size.

Africa
 List of South African universities by endowment

Europe
 List of United Kingdom universities by endowment
 See table below for France.

North America
 List of Canadian universities by endowment
 List of colleges and universities in the United States by endowment

Oceania
List of New Zealand universities by endowment

All others over US$1 billion

References